Fyodor Mikhailovich Rimsha (born in 1891; died in 1942) was an association football player. Fyodor, Olympics participant, died in 1942 in Leningrad during the siege of the city in World War II.

Rimsha made his debut for Russian Empire on July 1, 1912 in a 1912 Olympics game against Germany.

References

External links
  Profile

1891 births
1942 deaths
Russian footballers
Association football defenders
Russia international footballers
Footballers at the 1912 Summer Olympics
Olympic footballers of Russia
Victims of the Siege of Leningrad